Karl-Ernst Schroeter (3 December 1912 – 23 May 1943) was a Korvettenkapitän with the Kriegsmarine during World War II and commander of  and .

Schroeter commissioned the new Type IIB U-boat  on May 28, 1940 and served as her first commanding officer until March 30, 1941. The U-121 spent her entire career as training vessel and Schroeter saw no combat in her. From the U-121 Schroeter moved on to the new Type VIIC , which was commissioned on May 24, 1941. Schroeter would command the U-752 for the next two years until its sinking and his death on May 23, 1943.

War record

References

Bibliography

External links
uboat.net : Karl-Ernst Schroeter

1912 births
1943 deaths
People from Kożuchów
People from the Province of Silesia
U-boat commanders (Kriegsmarine)
Reichsmarine personnel
Kriegsmarine personnel killed in World War II
People lost at sea
Deaths by airstrike during World War II